Lieutenant General Friherre Samuel Lars Åkerhielm af Blombacka (23 October 1887 – 15 January 1976) was a Swedish Army officer. His senior commands include commander of the Norrbotten Artillery Corps from 1931 to 1937, the Royal Swedish Army Staff College from 1937 to 1940, Svea Artillery Regiment from 1940 to 1941, VII Military District from 1942 to 1948, Gotland Naval District from 1942 to 1948 and the I Military District from 1948 to 1953.

Career

Military career
Åkerhielm was born on 23 October 1887 in Stockholm, Sweden, the son of the President of the Administrative courts of appeal in Stockholm, Friherre Lars Åkerhielm and his wife Hulda (née Nyström). He passed mogenhetsexamen in Stockholm on 26 May 1906 and became a volunteer at the Svea Artillery Regiment (A 1) on 29 May the same year. He became an officer on 29 May 1908 and was commissioned as a underlöjtnant in the Svea Artillery Regiment on 31 December the same year. Åkerhielm attended the Artillery and Engineering College from 1910 to 1911 and graduated from en Artillery Course at the Artillery and Engineering College in 1913 and he was promoted to lieutenant on 2 August the same year. He attended the Royal Swedish Army Staff College from 1913 to 1915 and he served as an officer candidate in the General Staff from 1916 to 1919. He was appointed staff adjutant and promoted to captain in the General Staff on 19 December 1919 and to captain in the regiment on 24 November 1922.

Åkerhielm then served as a teacher of general staff service at the Royal Swedish Army Staff College from 1923 to 1927 and from 1928 to 1931. He was then appointed general staff officer in the staff of the IV Army Division on 15 October 1924 and then as captain in the regiment on 26 October 1926. Åkerhielm served as staff adjutant and captain in the General Staff from 27 June 1927 and chief adjutant and major in the General Staff from 21 December 1927. He was major and served as teacher at the Royal Swedish Army Staff College on 3 July 1930 and on 11 September 1931 he was appointed commander of the Norrbotten Artillery Corps (A 5). Åkerhielm was promoted to lieutenant colonel on 31 May 1934 and to colonel in the Swedish Army on 13 November 1936.

He then served as head of the Royal Swedish Army Staff College from 30 April 1937 and as regimental commander of the Svea Artillery Regiment from 1940. Åkerhielm was acting Chief of the Defence Staff in 1941 and acting army division commander of the II Army Division (II. arméfördelningen) also in 1941. Åkerhielm was promoted to major general and military commander of the VII Military District and the Gotland Naval District in 1942. He held the position for 6 years before being appointed military commander of the I Military District. He left active service in 1953 and was promoted to lieutenant general and transferred to the military reserve.

Other work
Åkerhielm was chairman of the Gotlands skarpskytte och jägargille ("Gotland Sharpshooter and Hunter Guild") from 1946 to 1948. He was also chairman of the Högkvarterskommissionen ("Headquarters Commission") from 1946 to 1947, the Försvarets krigsutredningskommission ("Swedish Armed Forces War Investigation Commission") from 1947 to 1955. Åkerhielm was inspector of the Högre Allmänna Läroverket i Kristianstad from 1948 to 1953.

Personal life
On 14 May 1913 in Stockholm, he married Frances Anna Margareta Reuterswärd (born 6 November 1891), the daughter of lieutenant colonel Carl Fredrik Casper Reuterswärd and Baroness Rosa Elisabet von Ungern-Sternberg. They had one daughter, Margareta Elisabet, born 12 February 1915 in Svea artilleriregemente Parish in Stockholm. She was married to editor Stig-Arne Öström de Boussard.

Death
Åkerhielm died on 15 January 1976 in Lund and buried in Lovö Cemetery on 30 January 1976.

Dates of rank
1908 – Underlöjtnant
1913 – Lieutenant
1920 – Captain
1929 – Major
1934 – Lieutenant colonel
1936 – Colonel
1942 – Major general
1953 – Lieutenant general

Awards and decorations
Åkerhielm's awards:

Swedish
   Commander Grand Cross of the Order of the Sword (4 June 1949)
   Swedish Central Federation for Voluntary Military Training Medal of Merit in silver
  King Gustaf V Olympic Commemorative Medal (Konung Gustaf V:s olympiska minnesmedalj) (1912)
  Gotland Association for Volunteer Military Training's Gold Medal (Gotlands befäls(utbildnings)förbunds guldmedalj)
  National Federation of Swedish Women's Auxiliary Defence Services' Silver Medal (Riksförbundet Sveriges lottakårers silvermedalj)
  Gotland Sharpshooter and Hunter Guild Medal of Merit (Gotlands skarpskytte och jägargilles förtjänstmedalj)

Foreign
   Commander of the Order of the White Rose of Finland
   Commander of the Order of the German Eagle
   Officer of the Order of Orange-Nassau with Swords (1931)

Honours
Member of the Royal Swedish Academy of War Sciences (1938)

References

1887 births
1976 deaths
Swedish Army lieutenant generals
Military personnel from Stockholm
Commanders Grand Cross of the Order of the Sword
Members of the Royal Swedish Academy of War Sciences